Sonnenland (German for "the land of sun") is a district of Maspalomas in the south of Gran Canaria, set on a hillside above Maspalomas and Playa del Inglés.  Originally designed for expatriates, it is gradually becoming home to a growing number of Spanish residents, many of whom work in the surrounding tourist areas such as Arguineguín, Maspalomas, and Puerto Rico.

Sonnenland was constructed in the 1980s, chiefly with bungalows. Since the late 1990s also some villas and hotels have been built.

References

Populated places in Gran Canaria